Robert William Paffrath (July 3, 1918 – May 21, 2005) was an American former professional football player who was a halfback. He played for the Miami Seahawks and the Brooklyn Dodgers of the All-America Football Conference, for the Ottawa Rough Riders of the Interprovincial Rugby Football Union, and for the Edmonton Eskimos of the Western Interprovincial Football Union. Paffrath also played one year in the Ontario Rugby Football Union with the Toronto Indians, where he was MVP.

References

1918 births
2005 deaths
American football halfbacks
Brooklyn Dodgers (AAFC) players
Edmonton Elks players
Miami Seahawks players
Minnesota Golden Gophers football players
Ottawa Rough Riders players
Ontario Rugby Football Union players
Sportspeople from Mankato, Minnesota